Philidris cruda is a species of ant in the genus Philidris. Described by Smith in 1860, the species is endemic to Indonesia.

References

Dolichoderinae
Insects described in 1860
Hymenoptera of Asia
Insects of Indonesia